The Karpagam Institute Of Technology (KIT) is one of the branches of Karpagam Institutions, which were referred to as KI's. KIT is approved by AICTE and affiliated to Anna University, Chennai. It is located near L&T Bypass road, Bodipalayam, Coimbatore.

Academics

Courses offered

Undergraduate programmes 

 B.E. Mechanical Engineering
 B.E. Computer Science and Engineering
 B.E. Electronics and Communication Engineering
 B.E. Electrical and Electronics Engineering
 B.Tech Information Technology
 B.Tech Artificial intelligence & Data Science

Description 
Good college in terms of Placement and it have some really good professors

List of best kind and good professors and staffs in karpagam Institute of technology department of science and humanities

 Prof. Nithyasri (English) 
 Prof. Naresh kumar (English) 
 Prof. Dr. Saritha mol (Chemistry) 
 Prof. Dr. Suthakaran (Physics) 
 Prof. Anitha (Chemistry) 
 Dr. Selva pandian (Director of Physical education) 
 Mr. Isravel raja (Physical education) 

 Prof. Dr. Nandhini (Mathematics) 
 Prof. Latha maragatham (Physics)

 Prof. DR. S. Padmanaban (Mathematics)

General 

In this institution the department of Electronic engineering being the largest department it is the only department to have more students than other departments. 
In this college three of the courses have National Board of Accreditation accreditation
The departments with accreditation are 
 Computer science and engineering
 Electronics and communication engineering
 Information technology

References 

Engineering colleges in Coimbatore
All India Council for Technical Education